Yaakov Perlow ( ‎; November 16, 1930 – April 7, 2020) was an American Hasidic rabbi and rosh yeshiva, and Rebbe of the Novominsk Hasidic dynasty. From 1998 until his death in 2020, he was president of Agudath Israel of America, a Haredi advocacy organization. He was also head of that organization's Moetzes Gedolei HaTorah (Council of Torah Sages). He was one of the most respected leaders of the American Orthodox Jewish community, known for his scholarly and oratorical skills.

Early life and education
Yaakov Perlow was born in Brooklyn, New York, to Rabbi Nochum Mordechai Perlow (1887–1976), the Novominsker Rebbe, and his wife, Beila Rochma Morgenstern. He was named after his paternal great-grandfather, the Shufra D'Yaakov, founder of the Novominsk Hasidic dynasty. His maternal grandfather was Rabbi Yitzchak Zelig Morgenstern, the Sokolover Rebbe, a direct descendant of Rabbi Menachem Mendel of Kotzk. Morgenstern was one of the main founders of Agudath Israel in Poland.

Perlow began his Torah education at Yeshiva Toras Chaim in East New York, Brooklyn, and continued on to the Lithuanian-type Yeshiva Rabbi Chaim Berlin in Brooklyn, and then Beth Medrash Govoha in Lakewood.  He also graduated with honors from Brooklyn College.

Career 
After his marriage, Perlow taught at Hebrew Theological College in Skokie, Illinois. He later moved back to Brooklyn and settled in Crown Heights, becoming a member of the administration of the mesivta of Yeshiva Rabbi Chaim Berlin. In 1969, he was appointed rosh yeshiva at the Breuer's yeshiva, Yeshiva Rabbi Samson Raphael Hirsch, in Washington Heights, New York, a position he held for 11 years. He also served as the Rav of Congregation Bais Yosef in that city.

After the death of his father on September 4, 1976, Perlow began serving as Novominsker Rebbe. In 1980, he established the Novominsk Hasidic Center and founded his own yeshiva, Yeshivas Novominsk Kol Yehuda, named in memory of his uncle, Rabbi Yehuda Aryeh Perlow of Novominsk-Williamsburg, in Borough Park, Brooklyn.

Agudath Israel of America
Perlow became an active member of Agudath Israel of America from 1975, when he was one of the main speakers at the 7th Siyum HaShas in New York. He became a leader of the Torah Umesorah organization as well. In December 1998, Perlow was named president of Agudath Israel of America, succeeding Rabbi Moshe Sherer, who had died seven months earlier. With his appointment, the presidential and leadership duties held by Sherer were divided between Perlow, the new president, and a three-man executive. Perlow was also head of the organization's Moetzes Gedolei HaTorah (Council of Torah Sages).

Perlow frequently spoke out on issues affecting the American Orthodox Jewish world, including Internet usage, child abuse, Holocaust denial, overpriced Jewish weddings, and U.S. politics. In 2015, Perlow shocked attendees at the 93rd annual Agudath Israel of America dinner by directly appealing to President Obama to reconsider the Iran deal.

At the 73rd annual Agudah convention in 1995, Perlow urged dialogue with non-Orthodox Jews while at the same time "lashing out at what he described as the 'false ideology' of non-Orthodox Judaism." In June 1999, he wrote in The Jewish Observer in support of a rapprochement in the long-standing feud between the Haredi and Reform movements. At the May 2014 Agudath dinner, he stated that the Reform and Conservative movements "have disintegrated themselves, become oblivious, fallen into an abyss of intermarriage and assimilation", and branded another movement, Open Orthodoxy, as being "steeped in apikorsos (heresy)". While New York City Mayor Bill de Blasio was the next speaker at the dinner, he did not challenge Perlow's remarks, which cast aspersions on the affiliations of the non-Orthodox Jewish population of New York City.

Personal life
Perlow's first wife, Yehudis (d. 1998), was the daughter of Grand Rabbi Avrohom Eichenstein of Zidichov-Chicago. The couple had two sons and two daughters. In 2004, Perlow remarried to Miriam Landynski, his first wife's sister and widow of Rabbi Yaakov Zev Landynski.

Death
In March 2020, Perlow urged American Orthodox Jews to follow social distancing and other precautionary guidelines in response to the coronavirus outbreak, saying: "We cannot behave the way we did last week or two weeks ago. We're told that the halakha (Jewish law) is that we must listen to doctors, whether it's about a sick person or Yom Kippur". He was soon after infected by COVID-19. On April 7, 2020, he died due to complications from the disease. He was 89. His funeral was held in a private ceremony. The eulogies and saying of Psalms were broadcast live over the telephone, in order to limit the spread of the virus. After his burial, his twin sons were named his successors as Rebbes of the Novominsk dynasty. The elder of the two, Rabbi Yehoshua Heshel "Reb Shia" currently leads his father's synagogue in Borough Park, while Rabbi Alter Yisroel Shimon "Reb Yisruel" leads the Novominsk shteeble in Lakewood, New Jersey. The two Rebbes lead Yeshivas Novominsk Kol Yehuda in unison, with Reb Shia predominantly responsible for the high school, and Reb Yisruel for the Beis Midrash.

Bibliography
In 1982, Perlow published the first of what would eventually be a seven-volume series called Adas Yaakov, with three volumes on topics in the Talmud, three volumes on the Jewish holidays, and one volume on Chumash.

References

Sources

External links
Photo of Rabbi Yaakov Perlow at the 12th Siyum HaShas, August 2, 2012
“City Council candidate John Heyer meets with Rabbi Yaakov Perlow and Rabbi Shmuel Lefkowitz” (video) September 4, 2009

1931 births
2020 deaths
Hasidic rebbes
Hasidic rosh yeshivas
American Hasidic rabbis
American people of Polish-Jewish descent
Moetzes Gedolei HaTorah
Writers from Brooklyn
20th-century American rabbis
21st-century American rabbis
Deaths from the COVID-19 pandemic in New York (state)